Nell Peak is the partly ice-free peak rising to 1432 m near the north end of Sentinel Range in Ellsworth Mountains, Antarctica.  It is named after the British geologist Philip Nell, a member of the joint BAS-Bulgarian field party on Alexander Island in the 1987/88 season.

Location
US mapping in 1961.

See also
 Mountains in Antarctica

Maps
 Newcomer Glacier.  Scale 1:250 000 topographic map.  Reston, Virginia: US Geological Survey, 1961.
 Antarctic Digital Database (ADD). Scale 1:250000 topographic map of Antarctica. Scientific Committee on Antarctic Research (SCAR). Since 1993, regularly updated.

Notes

External links
 Nell Peak SCAR Composite Gazetteer of Antarctica
 Bulgarian Antarctic Gazetteer Antarctic Place-names Commission (in Bulgarian)
 Basic data (in English)

External links
 Nell Peak. Copernix satellite image

Ellsworth Mountains
Bulgaria and the Antarctic
Mountains of Ellsworth Land